The National Library of Jamaica is the national library of Jamaica. It is located at 12 East Street in Kingston, Jamaica. The library provides access to various collection of Jamaican literature, maps, films, newspapers, photographs, and more.

History 
The library was established in 1979 by the Institute of Jamaica Act, 1978 from the collection of the West India Reference Library, which was created by Frank Cundall in 1894. The National Library of Jamaica is part of the Institute of Jamaica. The formation of the library was influenced by proposals calling for the need for such an institution identified by the Jamaica Library Association and other interested organizations.

Purpose 
The primary concern of the library is with the collection and preservation, organization and provision of access to all publications relating to Jamaica and its people; including publications created in Jamaica as well as those outside of the island. The library has modernized the library system in the country particularly the access to the collections it provides. It is home to rare as well as contemporary items including collections of books, audio books, maps and plans, manuscripts, newspapers, photographs, audio-visual materials, posters, serials, microfilm, calendars, prints, postcards and event programs. The National Library of Jamaica does not allow for the borrowing of its items for home use for its contents are only for research and study purposes, however, they do provide reading rooms, databases, and photocopying of selected material.

Divisions 
The library is composed of three divisions:

Technical Services

 Audiovisual and Micro-graphic services
 Research and Information
 Preservation and Conservation
 Special Collections

Networks and User Services

 Cataloging
 Collections Development
 Information Network Systems
 Digital Resources Development

Corporate Services

 Accounts
 Human Resource Management and Administration

Board of Management 
The national library is governed by a board of management currently consisting of up to thirteen members whom of which are responsible for the policy regulations and general supervision of the library. For the year 2019, these members include: Joy Dougas, Chairman, Lydia Rose, Deputy Chairman, Father Michael Allen, Vivian Crawford, Edward Baugh, Troy Caine (27 October 2008 – 10 January 2019), Dawn Henry, Dr. Paulette Kerr, Kellie Magnus, Evon Mullings, Jolette Russell, Beverley Lashley (National Librarian), Rolforde Johnston (Staff Representative).

See also 
 List of national libraries

References

External links
 Official website

Jamaica
Libraries in Jamaica
Buildings and structures in Kingston, Jamaica
Libraries established in 1979